Carmel Shama-Hacohen (born 16 August 1973) is an Israeli lawyer and politician. He served as a member of the Knesset for Likud in two spells between 2009 and 2014, before becoming Israel's envoy to the OECD, UNESCO and the Council of Europe. In 2018 he was elected mayor of Ramat Gan.

Early life
Born in Ramat Gan, Shama gained a law degree from the Interdisciplinary Center in Herzliya, and is also a certified estate agent. In 2010 he added 'Hacohen' as appendage to his surname to emphasise his Jewishness after many people had mistakenly taken him for a Druze.

Political career
A former chairman of the Likud youth council, in 2002 Shama became chairman of the party's Ramat Gan branch. The following year was elected onto the city council, where he held the environment portfolio. He was also a member of the city's audit commission, where he triggered a police investigation into mayor Zvi Bar over property deals. For the 2009 Knesset elections Shama won twenty-fifth place on the Likud list, the place reserved for youth candidates. He entered the Knesset as the party won 27 seats.

Prior to the 2013 elections Shama was placed 32nd on the joint Likud Yisrael Beiteinu list, losing his seat as the alliance won only 31 seats. Although he returned to the Knesset in June 2014 as a replacement for Reuven Rivlin after he was elected President, Shama resigned on 6 August 2014 after becoming Israel's envoy to the OECD, UNESCO and the Council of Europe. He was replaced in the Knesset by Alex Miller.

In the 2018 municipal elections, Shama was elected mayor of Ramat Gan, unseating incumbent Yisrael Zinger.

Camal is considered a relatively independent voice within the broader Likud movement, and is a frequent critic of the Likud. He criticized many decisions of the coalition emerging after the 2022 elections and Netanyahu (who he claims to have lost his judgment due to his legal needs). He promised to protect LGBT people in Ramat Gan also from his party's votes if required as Mayor.

Personal life
Shama is married to Vered with three sons and a daughter, and lives in Ramat Ef'al.

References

External links

Carmel Shama on the OECD website

1973 births
People from Ramat Gan
Reichman University alumni
Israeli lawyers
Living people
Likud politicians
Members of the 18th Knesset (2009–2013)
Members of the 19th Knesset (2013–2015)
Mayors of Ramat Gan